The Monument to Zagir Ismagilov is a monument to composer Zagir Ismagilov. It is located at Bashkir State Opera and Ballet Theatre in Ufa, Bashkortostan. It opened in 2008.

References

Monuments and memorials in Ufa
Statues in Russia
Sculptures of men in Russia
Outdoor sculptures in Russia